St. Augustine is a parliamentary electoral district in Trinidad and Tobago in the north of Trinidad. It has been represented since 2020 by Khadijah Ameen of the United National Congress.

Constituency profile 
The constituency was created prior to the 1991 general election. It borders D'Abadie/O'Meara, Arouca/Maloney, Tunapuna, Barataria/San Juan, Chaguanas West, La Horquetta/Talparo and Caroni East. The main towns are Piarco, Valsayn South, Curepe, Macoya, St Augustine and parts of Trincity and Tacarigua. It had an electorate of 27,244 as of 2015. It is considered a safe seat for the United National Congress although it was won by the Congress of the People in 2010 and 2015.

Members of Parliament 
This constituency has elected the following members of the House of Representatives of Trinidad and Tobago:

Election results

Elections in the 2020s

Elections in the 2010s

References 

Constituencies of the Parliament of Trinidad and Tobago